The Voice of Ireland is an Irish reality talent show. The second series began airing on 6 January 2013 on RTÉ One. Bressie, Kian Egan and Sharon Corr return as coaches while Jamelia replaces Brian Kennedy, who left the show after the first series. This is the final series to feature Sharon Corr, who is being replaced by Dolores O'Riordan in the next series. Kathryn Thomas returns to present the main show, while Eoghan McDermott returns to co-present and Stephen Byrne covers the backstage V-Reporting. The winner of the second series was Keith Hanley from Team Jamelia.

Auditions for this series took place at the end of 2012. The Blind auditions took place on 21, 22, 23, 24 and 25 October at The Helix. A change this season is that of, if a coach has a full team of 12, they are still able to press their button and state their case as to why the artist should pick them. The Battle Rounds took place on 28 and 29 November at The Helix. The live shows began on 17 March 2013 with the final taking place on 28 April.

Keith Hanley, mentored by Jamelia, won the series, while Kelly Mongan coming second, Shane McLaughlin coming third and Shannon Murphy coming fourth.

Teams
Color key

Blind Auditions
The Blind auditions took place on 21, 22, 23, 24 and 25 October at The Helix. The coaches choose teams of artists through a blind audition process. Each coach has the length of the artists' performance to decide if they want that artist on their team. Should two or more coaches want the same artist, then the artist gets to choose their coach. Once the coaches have picked their team, they are to pit them against each other in the ultimate sing off; The Battles. A change this season is that of, if a coach has a full team of 12, they are still able to press their button and state their case as to why the artist should pick them.
Color key

Blind Auditions 1

Blind Auditions 2

Blind Auditions 3

Blind Auditions 4

Blind Auditions 5

Blind Auditions 6

Battles
The Battle Rounds took place on 28 and 29 November at The Helix. Each coach's artists performed at The Helix for The Battle Rounds. Each team of artists were mentored and developed by their coach. In this stage, two artists from the same team, battle against each other by singing the same song, with the coach choosing which artist to send through to the live shows.

Color key

Battles 1

Battles 2

Battles 3
Mark McLaughlin from Team Sharon withdrew from the competition due to an injury which left him incapable of singing. He and battle partner John Gaughan's original song choice was Foster the People's "Pumped Up Kicks". This left a vacancy for Sharon's tri-pairing which were Jennifer Lyons, Fiona McCourt and Aoife McLoughlin. It was then revealed that Lyons would replace McLaughlin and battle Gaughan. The song choice was changed to Bruno Mars' "Marry You".

Battles 4

Live shows
The live shows began on 17 March 2013. The remaining artists competed against each other in live TV broadcasts at The Helix, with the viewers helping decide who advances and who exits the competition. When the top 10 artists remain, the artists will compete against each other hoping to make it to the finale on 28 April. The winner of the show will become The Voice of Ireland and get offered a contract with Universal Music worth €100,000.

Results summary
Color keys
Artist's info

Result details

Live show details
Color key

Live Show 1 (17 March)
Coaches performance: "Teenage Kicks"
Guest performer: Pat Byrne ("All or Nothing")

Three artists from each team performed with one from each team being eliminated
Each coach rated each artists performance out of ten
The public vote was combined with the coaches' scores
The artist from each team with the highest combined total was sent through to the next round
Each coach sent a second artist from their own team through to the next round

Live Show 2 (24 March)
Guest performer: Lawson ("Learn to Love Again")

Three artists from each team performed with one from each team being eliminated
Each coach rated each artists performance out of ten
The public vote was combined with the coaches' scores
The artist from each team with the highest combined total was sent through to the next round
Each coach sent a second artist from their own team through to the next round

Live Show 3 (31 March)
Guest performer: Bressie ("Show Me Love")
 Team performance: Jamelia and Team Jamelia ("Anything Could Happen")

Two artists performed on each team with one from each team being immediately sent through to the Top 10
Each artists' performance was rated out of ten by the three opposing coaches
The coaches did not rate their own artists
The coaches' scores were combined with the public vote
The artist in each team with the highest combined total were saved
Of the remaining four artists, one more was sent through to the Top 10 on a Wildcard
The artist with the highest combined total was saved

Live Show 4 (7 April)
Guest performer: McFly ("Shine a Light" and "Love Is Easy")
Team performance: Kian Egan and Team Kian ("Are You Gonna Be My Girl")

Two artists performed on each team with one from each team being immediately sent through to the Top 10
Each artists' performance was rated out of ten by the three opposing coaches
The coaches did not rate their own artists
The coaches' scores were combined with the public vote
The artist in each team with the highest combined total were saved
Of the remaining four artists, one more was sent through to the Top 10 on a Wildcard
The artist with the highest combined total was saved

Top 10 (14 April)
Guest performers: Stooshe ("Slip") and Jamelia ("Thank You/Superstar")
Team performance: Sharon Corr and Team Sharon ("Hall of Fame")

Each artist was scored by their three opposing coaches out of ten.
The coaches' scores were then combined with the public vote.
The four artists with the lowest combined total (irrespective of which team they were part of) were eliminated.

Semi-final (21 April)
Coaches performance: "Let's Dance"
Guest performers: The Coronas ("Closer to You" and "Dreaming Again") and Sharon Corr ("We Could Be Lovers")
Team performance: Bressie and Team Bressie ("Caravan of Love")

Final (28 April) 
Finalists performance: "Good Time"
Guest performer: The Saturdays ("Issues" and "What About Us")

Ratings

References

External links
The Voice of Ireland  at RTÉ

2
2013 Irish television seasons